WFNR was a news/talk formatted broadcast radio station licensed to Blacksburg, Virginia, serving the New River Valley. WFNR was last owned and operated by Monticello Media after its 2018 purchase of Cumulus Media's Blacksburg–Christiansburg cluster.

WFNR went off the air on January 31, 2019, due to equipment failures at its transmitter site. The station had special temporary authority to remain silent until July 31.

Its license was cancelled on February 11, 2022, for being off the air for 3 years.

References

External links
FCC Station Search Details: DWFNR (Facility ID: 67588)
FCC History Cards for WFNR (covering 1966-1981 as WQBX)

1974 establishments in Virginia
2022 disestablishments in Virginia
Defunct radio stations in the United States
Radio stations established in 1974
Radio stations disestablished in 2022
FNR
FNR
FNR